The Cyprus Institute of Neurology and Genetics is a non-profit institution that was established in 1990.

It specialises in neurology, molecular biology and all aspects of human genetics. It also collaborates with the University of Cyprus on a Medical Genetics graduate programme.

See also
Cyprus Neuroscience and Technology Institute
The Cyprus Institute

External links

Organizations established in 1990
Medical and health organisations based in Cyprus
Neuroscience research centers in Cyprus
Research institutes in Cyprus
1990 establishments in Cyprus